Ruper Ordorika, born at Oñati (Gipuzkoa) in 1956, is a Basque singer-songwriter. He is generally considered one of the greatest renewers of basque songwriting.
He was part of the literary group Pott, with, among others, writers Joseba Sarrionandia, Bernardo Atxaga, J.M. Iturralde.

Discography

Albums
Hautsi Da Anphora (Xoxoa-Elkar, 1980)
Ni Ez Naiz Noruegako Errege (Elkar, 1983)
Bihotzerreak (Elkar, 1985)
Ez Da Posible (Gasa-Wea, 1990)
So'Ik'So (Nuevos Medios, 1995)
Dabilen Harria (Nuevos Medios, 1998)
Gaur (Esan Ozenki, 2000)
Hurrengo Goizean (Metak, 2001)
Kantuok Jartzen Ditut (Metak, 2003)
Memoriaren Mapan (Elkar, 2006)
Hamar t'erdietan (Elkar, 2008)
Haizea Garizumakoa (Elkar, 2009)
Hodeien azpian  (Elkar, 2011).
Azukre koxkorrak  (Elkar, 2013).
Lurrean etzanda (Elkar, 2014).
Lurrean etzanda (Elkar, 2014).
Guria Ostatuan (Elkar, 2016).
Bakarka (Elkar, 2018).
Kafe Antzokian (Elkar, 2019).
Amour et toujours (Elkar, 2021).

Singles/EPs
Ruper Ordorika & Mugalaris (Emak Bakia, 1992)

Albums with Hiru Truku
Hiru Truku (Nuevos Medios, 1994)
Hiru Truku II (Nuevos Medios, 1997)
Nafarroako Kantu Zaharrak (Metak, 2004)

External links
Ruper Ordorika official website
Website for Ruper Ordorika at Metak records

1956 births
Living people
Basque musicians
Spanish folk musicians
Basque-language singers
People from Oñati